Artur Mija (born 7 November 1990) is a Moldovan politician. He has served as member of the Moldovan parliament from 2021 until 2023. He is the current Secretary General of the Government of Moldova. He is a member of the Party of Action and Solidarity and is the Secretary of the party since 2022.

References 

Living people
1990 births
21st-century Moldovan politicians